Jérôme Louis Rakotomalala (15 July 1914 – 1 November 1975) was a Malagasy Cardinal of the Roman Catholic Church. He served as Archbishop of Tananarive from 1960 until his death, and was elevated to the cardinalate in 1969.

Biography
Jérôme Rakotomalala was born in Sainte-Marie, and studied at the Regional Seminary of Ambotaraka. He was ordained to the priesthood on 31 July 1943 and then did pastoral work in Tananarive until 1946. He served as a professor at the Ambotaraka seminary, director of Saint Peter Canisius School, and vicar general of Tananarive from 1946 to 1960.

On 4 April 1960 Rakotomalala was appointed Archbishop of Tananarive by Pope John XXIII. He received his episcopal consecration on the following 8 May from Pope John himself, with Bishops Napoléon-Alexandre Labrie, CIM and Fulton J. Sheen serving as co-consecrators, in St. Peter's Basilica. Rakotomalala later attended the Second Vatican Council from 1962 to 1965, and sat on the council's Central Preparatory Commission.

Pope Paul VI created him Cardinal Priest of S. Marie Consolatrice al Tiburtino in the consistory of 28 April 1969. Rakotomalala was the first cardinal to hail from Madagascar as well.

The Cardinal died in Tananarive, at the age of 62. He is buried in the metropolitan cathedral of Tananarive, now called Antananarivo.

See also
Catholic Church in Madagascar

References

External links
Catholic-Hierarchy
Cardinals of the Holy Roman Church

1914 births
1975 deaths
People from Analanjirofo
Malagasy cardinals
20th-century Roman Catholic archbishops in Madagascar
Participants in the Second Vatican Council
Cardinals created by Pope Paul VI
Malagasy Roman Catholic archbishops
Malagasy Roman Catholic bishops
Roman Catholic archbishops of Antananarivo